The 53rd Troop Command is an administrative headquarters of the New York Army National Guard that provides direction for units not under another brigade or other formation headquarters (HQ). It also provides administrative support to units from other formations in the New York area that are stationed a long way from their higher HQ.

History
The 53rd Troop Command descends from a New York Army National Guard administrative grouping established after the American Civil War. Following the Civil War, efforts were made to link the varied military units in New York under overall headquarters. As a result of this the 3rd Brigade, New York State Militia, came into being on 5 August 1886.

The Brigade consisted of the 4th Battery at Troy, the 6th Battery in Binghamton, the 10th Battalion in Albany (Infantry), and a number of separate companies. The separate companies included the 3rd Company at Oneonta, the 4th Company at Yonkers, the 5th Company at Newburgh, the 12th Company in Troy, the 14th Company at Kingston, the 15th Company at Poughkeepsie, the 16th Company at Catskill, the 18th Company in Glens Falls, the 19th Company in Poughkeepsie, the 20th Company in Binghamton, the 21st Company in Troy, the 22nd Company in Saratoga, the 23rd Company in Hudson, the 24th Company in Utica, the 27th Company in Malone, the 28th Company in Utica, and the 31st Company in Albany.

World War I
For World War I the Headquarters Detachment was organized on 12 July 1917 and on 16 July 1917 mustered into federal service. It arrived in Camp Wadsworth, Spartanburg, South Carolina in early fall and was redesignated the 53rd Brigade of the U.S. 27th Division. It was now composed of the 105th Infantry Regiment, the 106th Infantry Regiment and the 105th Machine Gun Battalion.
During May 1918, the 53rd Brigade sailed to France and assembled with the Division in the Rue area.

The 53rd was involved in the following major operations:

The Dickebursch-Scherpenberg Defensive Sector in Flanders
The Ypres-Lys Offensive in Belgium
The Somme Offensive (1918) in Picardy
These operations covered secondary battles, engagements and minor operations of the East Poperinghe Line, Vierstraat Ridge, the Hindenburg Line, Le Selle River Jonc DeMer Ridge and the St. Maurice River.

Demobilization and inter-war years
The 53d Brigade returned to the US early in 1919 and was demobilized at Camp Upton Long Island on 30 March 1919. It resumed the designation of the 3rd Brigade, National Guard of New York.

In 1921, the 3rd Brigade, consisting of the 2nd, 10th and the 23rd regiments, National Guard of New York, was redesignated as the 53d Brigade. The Headquarters Company of the 53rd was organized on 13 July 1921 and was again assigned to the US 27th Division.  The regiments were redesignated to their World War I designations, and once more assumed its old composition of the 105th Infantry Regiment (former 2nd New York) and 106th Infantry Regiment (former 106th New York) and elements of the 10th New York Regiment.

World War II
In September 1940, the 106th Infantry was taken out of the Brigade (and redesignated a Coastal Artillery regiment), it was replaced by the 10th Infantry. In December 1940 the 10th was redesignated the 106th Infantry Regiment.

On 15 October 1940 the 27th Division was activated for World War II. During December 1941 the Division deployed to its training areas at Fort McClellan, Alabama, to California. From 27 February to 15 March the Division moved to Hilo, Hawaii. The 27th Division was the first National Guard unit to go overseas, this began the longest wartime overseas service of any National Guard Division in the US Army. The Division garrisoned the Hawaiian Islands, the 53d Brigade was responsible for the "big" island of Hawaii. On 31 August 1942 the Division was "triangulized" into three main Regimental Combat Teams (RCT). The Headquarters 53rd Brigade was redesignated the 27th Cavalry Reconnaissance Troop.

The history of the 27th Division in the Pacific includes; 16 June to 9 July 1944 Saipan, 9 April to September 1945 Okinawa, September to 12 December 1945 occupation of Japan in the Sasebo area of Honshū and towards the end of September in Northern Japan. Specific parts of RCTs of the 27th participated in other campaigns but they did not include the 27th Cavalry Reconnaissance Troop. The Division left Yokohama on 12 December 1945 and arrived in Seattle, Washington 26 December 1945. The Division was deactivated 31 December 1945 at Ft Lawton, Washington.

Creation of State Area Command 
Creation of State Area Command (STARC), Headquarters Troop Command (HTC) at Washington Avenue Armory, Albany, which replaced the CAC.

With the completion of the new headquarters and armory in Latham the HTC was relocated to Latham in November 1986. The closure of the Washington Avenue Armory in early 1991 and other force structure saw the HTC relocated to Glenmore Road Armory in Troy, to replace the 205th Support Group and 27th Rear Area Operations Center (RAOC) which relocated to NYC. Upon the re-designation of the 42d Infantry Division as Armor, and the headquarters of a consolidated North East Division, the HTC and the 42d in the 14th Street Armory in New York City exchanged locations. The closure of the 14th Street Armory compelled the HTC to relocate to Camp Smith, Peekskill. In 1998 space became available at the Valhalla Armory and the headquarters was again relocated to this facility.

The National Guard Bureau advised on 26 March 1994 that troop commands had been authorized to be redesignated with a numerical designation. Effective 1 July 1994, the STARC-HTC was redesignated with its old 53d designation as the 53rd Troop Command.

Current organization
 Headquarters and Headquarters Detachment (HHD), 53rd Troop Command
  369th Sustainment Brigade
 369th Special Troops Battalion, Harlem
 Headquarters, 369th Sustainment Brigade, Harlem
 369th Early Entry Element, Harlem
 719th Transportation Company, Harlem
 1569th Transportation Company, New Windsor
 133rd Quartermaster Company, Brooklyn
 145th Maintenance Company, Staten Island
 27th Financial Management Detachment, Whitestone
  104th Military Police Battalion, Kingston, New York
 HHD, 104th Military Police Battalion, Kingston
 727th Military Police Detachment Law and Order, Poughkeepsie
 222nd Chemical Company, Brooklyn
 442nd Military Police Company, Jamaica, New York
 107th Military Police Company, Brooklyn, New York
 466th Area Support Medical Company, Queensbury, New York
 101st Expeditionary Signal Battalion (ESB)
 Headquarters, 101st ESB, Yonkers
 A Company, 101st ESB, Peekskill
 B Company, 101st ESB, Orangeburg
 C Company, 101st ESB, Yonkers
 153rd Troop Command Brigade, Buffalo
 HHD, 153rd Troop Command Brigade, Buffalo
  102nd Military Police Battalion, Auburn
 Headquarters and Headquarters Company Auburn
 105th Military Police Company, Buffalo
 222nd Military Police Company, Rochester
 206th Military Police Company, Latham
 272nd Military Police Brigade Liaison, Rochester
  204th Engineer Battalion, Binghamton
 Headquarters, 204th Engineer Battalion, Binghamton
 Forward Support Company, 204th Engineer Battalion, Binghamton
 152nd Engineer Support Company, Buffalo
 827th Engineer Company (Horizontal), Horseheads
 1156th Engineer Company (Vertical), Kingston
  501st Ordnance Battalion (Explosive Ordnance Disposal), Glenville
 Headquarters, 501st Explosive Ordnance Disposal Battalion, Glenville
 1108th Ordnance Company, Glenville
 138th Public Affairs Detachment, Latham
 1427th Medium Truck Company, Queensbury

Current mission
Command, control, and supervise Army National Guard units attached to the Troop Command so as to provide manned, trained and equipped units capable of immediate expansion to war strength and available for service in time of war or national emergency or when appropriate to augment the active army.

Notes

External links
New York State Division of Military and Naval Affairs: 53rd Troop Command

Troop Commands of the United States Army National Guard
Military units and formations in New York (state)
Military units and formations established in 1917